Mattawa is a town in northeastern Ontario, Canada on Algonquin Nation land at the confluence of the Mattawa and Ottawa Rivers in Nipissing District. Mattawa means "Meeting of the Waters" in the Algonquin language. The first Europeans to pass through this area were Étienne Brûlé and Samuel de Champlain.

History
The area is historically inhabited by  Algonquin Indigenous peoples who used used the Mattawa River as an important transportation corridor for many centuries. In 1610, Étienne Brûlé and in 1615, Samuel de Champlain were the first Europeans to travel through the Mattawa area. For some 200 years thereafter, it was a link in the important water route leading from Montreal west to Lake Superior. Canoes travelling west up the Ottawa turned left at "the Forks" (the mouth of the Mattawa) to enter the "Petite Rivière" ("Small River", as compared to the Ottawa), before continuing on to Lake Nipissing. 

Other notable travellers who passed by Mattawa include: Jean Nicolet in 1620, Jean de Brébeuf in 1626, Gabriel Lallemant in 1648, Pierre-Esprit Radisson and Médard des Groseilliers in 1658, La Verendrye in 1731, Alexander MacKenzie in 1794, and David Thompson in 1812.

The Mattawa House was established by the Northwest Company in 1784. In the 1820s and 1830s, the Hudson's Bay Company (after it had merged with the Northwest Company) sent canoe brigades from their Fort Coulonge Post to the Mattawa River junction in order to trade furs. In 1837, a permanent post was established, but was moved to a new site in the centre of present-day Mattawa in 1843. It was subordinate to Fort Témiscamingue and Fort Coulonge, but after the arrival of the telegraph in 1871 and the railroad in 1880, it became the headquarters of the Timiskaming District. As the fur trade diminished and the population grew, the post became a general store, trading merchandise to supply lumbermen. It closed in the early 20th century (1908 or 1912, depending on source).

The fur trade led to the establishment of Métis communities in Canada, and in 2017 the Ontario government and the Métis Nation of Ontario (MNO), in a collaborative project of reconciliation, jointly identified The Mattawa / Ottawa River Historic Métis Community as having once existed in the region, stating, "While identification of these historic Métis communities is a significant milestone, this alone does not determine who in Ontario is Métis or who holds Métis rights, nor define Métis harvesting areas or territories."

In the 19th century, Mattawa became a hub for the logging industry, which would harvest large untouched stands of white pine in the area and use the Mattawa River to transport logs to sawmills. In 1881, the railroad was built to Mattawa. It was mostly built by French Canadian labourers. After the railroad's completion, some of these labourers and their families settled in Mattawa (and surrounding areas), bringing with them their culture and heritage.

Logging is still an important industry in this region, and nearby provincial parks and wilderness support the camping/hunting/fishing tourism industry in Mattawa today. Mattawa is located on the Canadian Pacific Railway Chalk River subdivision, connecting Smiths Falls and North Bay, with an additional connection to Témiscaming, Quebec.

Mattawa elected Canada's first-ever Black mayor, Firmin Monestime, in 1963. He served until his death in 1977.

In April 2010, the old Mattawa hospital (visible as the red building in the adjacent image) was demolished amid controversy, since the building was a local landmark for which heritage status was considered. A new Mattawa Hospital had been in service for about a year. The area is also served by the regional hospital in nearby North Bay. The old hospital site is expected to be used for the construction of a new secondary school, funded by the Province of Ontario through the Conseil Scolaire de District Catholique Franco-Nord.

Demographics 

Population trend:
Population 2011: 2,023
Population 2006: 2,003
Population 2001: 2,270
Population 1996: 2,281
Population 1991: 2,454

34% of Mattawanians are Francophone.

Attractions

Mattawa is the site of many large wooden statues depicting local historical figures, such as Champlain, Pierre-Esprit Radisson, Médard des Groseilliers, and others. The Mattawa District Museum prominently features a  statue of Big Joe Mufferaw, a regional folk hero. The statues are placed widely throughout Mattawa, and in two locations outside the town on nearby Highway 17.

Three crosses are on the mountain on the east side of the Ottawa River, immediately opposite the mouth of the Mattawa River.  The crosses have been replaced several times. They are accessible via a trail which begins at the Quebec end of the railroad bridge which crosses the Ottawa.

Mattawa provides access to numerous dropping off points for canoeing or boating on the Ottawa River. The river acts as a natural border between the hills of the province of Quebec and Ontario. The Mattawa River flows through the Canadian Shield, and wildlife can often be seen and heard. The area offers fishing, camping, and hiking. There are numerous motels, campgrounds, and retreat centres in and around Mattawa.

Just west is Samuel de Champlain Provincial Park, on the Mattawa River. The park is also home of the Canadian Ecology Centre, an eco-friendly retreat centre that is facilitated to accommodate business retreats. Algonquin Provincial Park can be accessed from the north side in Kiosk or the east side in Brent.

In 2007, Mattawa and the townships of Bonfield, Papineau-Cameron, Mattawan and Calvin were rebranded as a single Mattawa Voyageur Country tourist region, in order to promote the area.

Voyageur Days 
Every summer since 1997, the Mattawa Voyageur Days Festival is held the last weekend (Thursday-Sunday) of July. It is organized by the Town of Mattawa. Concerts take place behind the Museum on Explorer's Point, with many other events and attractions around town. Some of the events include a regional talent night, car show, lumberjack competition, and canoe race. Live music is a large part of the Festival, and has in the past included such notable Canadian musicians as April Wine, Trooper, Saga, Loverboy, Honeymoon Suite, Chuck Labelle, David Wilcox, Peter Frampton, Heart, Tom Cochrane and as well as Survivor. Up-and-coming artists from inside and outside the region take the stage on the Thursday night.

On the Sunday night, at dusk, there is a traditional choreographed fireworks show.

Mattawa Voyageur Days celebrated its 10th anniversary in July 2007, selling out of its 7,000 admission wristbands before the event had begun.  In 2008, Festivals and Events Ontario listed Mattawa Voyageur Days as one of the Top 100 Ontario Festivals.

Musical references

Blue Rodeo released a song called "Mattawa" on their 2013 album In Our Nature. Mattawa is also mentioned in the Stompin' Tom Connors song "Big Joe Mufferaw", which references a Canadian folk hero named Big Joe Mufferaw who supposedly "paddled into Mattawa, all the way from Ottawa in just one day."  Mattawa is the 16th location (of 90) mentioned in the North American version of Geoff Mack's country song I've Been Everywhere.

Media

Radio
Mattawa is served by two low-power AM repeaters of Greater Sudbury's CBC Radio stations, including one FM radio station CJTK-FM:
AM 1090 - CBON-12, Première Chaîne
AM 1240 - CBLO, CBC Radio One
FM 93.9 - CJTK-FM, Christian radio (repeats CJTK-FM-1 North Bay, Ontario).

The town is otherwise served by radio stations from North Bay.

Print

Mattawa's weekly newspaper The Mattawa Recorder has been in publication since 1972. It is owned and published by Tom and Heather Edwards.

Notable people
Anahareo, wife of writer and conservationist Grey Owl
Mauril Bélanger, Member of Parliament (1995-2016)
Lillian Bilsky Freiman, philanthropist and Zionist
Donald Hogarth, politician and mining financier
Chuck Labelle, Franco-Ontarian singer/songwriter
John C. Major, puisine justice of the Supreme Court of Canada (1992-2005)
 Dr. Firmin Monestime, Canada's first black mayor
Gilbert Parent, Speaker of the House of Commons of Canada
Chick Webster, hockey player

See also
List of francophone communities in Ontario

References

External links

 
Hudson's Bay Company trading posts
Single-tier municipalities in Ontario
Towns in Ontario